Hernán Rogelio Vera Pavía (28 October 1892 – 29 January 1964) was a Mexican actor known for usually playing short, small roles, usually as a bartender, during the Golden Age of Mexican cinema.

He began his career in theater, with some works by author Antonio Esquivel Magaña. He also belonged to the Alfonso Rogelini zarzuela company in 1925.

His first film was Allá en el Rancho Grande (1936) by director Fernando de Fuentes. He worked in more than 200 films and although his participation in them was usually short, his characters tended to be related to the main characters.

Selected filmography
Allá en el Rancho Grande (1936) 
Mi candidato (1938)
The Rock of Souls (1942)
The Spectre of the Bride (1943)
The Shack (1945)
A Day with the Devil (1945)
Five Faces of Woman (1947)
The Private Life of Mark Antony and Cleopatra (1947)
Music, Poetry and Madness (1948)
Los tres huastecos (1948)
Midnight (1949)
Zorina (1949) 
Hypocrite (1949)
Primero soy mexicano (1950)
Cuatro contra el mundo (1950)
The Mark of the Skunk (1950)
A Gringo Girl in Mexico (1951)
They Say I'm a Communist (1951)
Maria Islands (1951)
Port of Temptation (1951)
Oh Darling! Look What You've Done! (1951)
Soledad's Shawl (1952)
Penjamo (1953)
The Lottery Ticket Seller (1953)
Madness of Love (1953)
Dona Mariquita of My Heart (1953)
Anxiety (1953)
You Had To Be a Gypsy (1953)
God Created Them (1953)
When I Leave (1954)
The Viscount of Monte Cristo (1954)
Bluebeard (1955)
A Few Drinks (1958)
Rebel Without a House (1960)
Invincible Guns (1960)
Dangers of Youth (1960)

References

Bibliography
 Magaña-Esquivel, Antonio; Ceballos, Edgar. 2000. Imagen y realidad del teatro en México, 1533-1960. México, D.F.: Instituto Nacional de Bellas Artes.

External links

1892 births
1964 deaths
Male actors from Yucatán (state)
Mexican male film actors
20th-century Mexican male actors
People from Mérida, Yucatán